Avanti Lebbeke was a Belgian handball club from Lebbeke. It was one of the leading Belgian clubs through the 1970s and the first half of the 1980s, winning twice the male championship and three times the national cup in addition to five female championships. Both teams took part in IHF international competitions.

Titles
 Men
 First Division
 1972, 1973
 Belgian Cup
 1972, 1979, 1985
 Women
 First Division
 1974, 1976, 1977, 1983, 1984
cup: 1972

References

Belgian handball clubs
Sport in East Flanders